Leucophenga maculosa is a species of fruit fly in the family Drosophilidae. It is found in Eastern United States.

References

Drosophilidae
Diptera of North America
Taxa named by Daniel William Coquillett
Insects described in 1895
Articles created by Qbugbot